John Trower Wilkins III (October 15, 1880 – October 9, 1929) was an American politician who served in the Virginia House of Delegates.

References

External links 

1880 births
1929 deaths
Members of the Virginia House of Delegates
20th-century American politicians